William Thomas Y'Blood (November 12, 1937 – December 16, 2006) was an American World War II historian, notable as the author of eight books that have been translated into ten languages.

Biography 
Y'Blood's career as a pilot, first in the U.S. Air Force flying Boeing B-47s and later as a commercial pilot for Continental Airlines was reflected in the subjects he chose to write about. His first publication, Stratojet in Action, is a pictorial history of the B-47. Red Sun Setting, his account of the Battle of the Philippine Sea, contains classic descriptions of dogfights and aerial attacks on Japanese carriers. He turned his focus to escort carriers in his next two books, Hunter-Killer and The Little Giants, earning praise and awards from the Burma Star Association and Escort Carrier Airmen and Sailors.

Later in life, Y'Blood took a position with the Air Force History office at the Pentagon as a historian, where he remained until his death in 2006. He turned his attention to other wars, focusing considerable effort on the Korean War and the overlooked role air power played in that conflict. As one critic from the Air Power Journal said, "Y'Blood's writing is concise, well written, and accurate. It is popular history at its best."

Bibliography 
 Stratojet in Action (1977)
 Red Sun Setting (1981)
 Hunter-Killer (1983)
 The Little Giants (1987)
 The Three Wars of Lt. General George E. Stratemeyer (1999)
 MiG Alley: The Fight for Air Superiority (2000)
 Reflections and Remembrances: Veterans of the United States Army Air Forces Reminisce about World War II (2002)
 Down in the Weeds: Close Air Support in Korea (2002)
 Air Commandos Against Japan (2008) *published posthumously*

20th-century American historians
Historians of World War II
Historians of the Korean War
1937 births
2006 deaths
American military historians
American male non-fiction writers
Air force historians
Commercial aviators